Zdravko Divjak (born 30 May 1956) is a Yugoslav former swimmer. He competed in two events at the 1976 Summer Olympics.

References

1956 births
Living people
Croatian male swimmers
Yugoslav male swimmers
Olympic swimmers of Yugoslavia
Swimmers at the 1976 Summer Olympics
Sportspeople from Bjelovar